Kim Kyung-wook (born April 18, 1970) is a South Korean archer and Olympic champion. She competed at the 1996 Summer Olympics in Atlanta, where she won a gold medal with the South Korean archery team, and also an individual gold medal. Furthermore, Kim Kyung-wook is now the owner and head coach of GK96 archery club located in Cerritos, California. GK96 is a top ranked club in California.

References

External links
 
 
 

1970 births
Living people
South Korean female archers
Olympic archers of South Korea
Archers at the 1996 Summer Olympics
Olympic gold medalists for South Korea
Olympic medalists in archery
Medalists at the 1996 Summer Olympics
People from Yeoju
South Korean Buddhists
Sportspeople from Gyeonggi Province
20th-century South Korean women